The 2007 World Allround Speed Skating Championships were held in the indoor arena Thialf in Heerenveen, Netherlands on 9–11 February 2007. The Championships were three-day allround events, with the skaters completing four distances before the final championship standings are determined based on the samalog system. The organising body, the Koninklijke Nederlandsche Schaatsenrijders Bond (KNSB), celebrated its 125-year anniversary with full stands on all three days.

Athletes from the host country, the Netherlands, won both the men's and the women's event; Sven Kramer set a world record on the men's 10,000 metres on his way to the European and World Allround double, while Ireen Wüst won by nearly two points after being narrowly beaten by Martina Sáblíková at the European Championships. For the first time since 1979, the male and female World Champion came from the same country. Defending champion Shani Davis finished sixth after losing time on the two longest distances, while former sprint World Champion Erben Wennemars debuted at the World Allround Championships with a fifth place. Last year's female champion, Cindy Klassen, finished third, a quarter of a point behind Anni Friesinger, who did not compete in 2006.

Men championships

500 m 
World Championships debutant Wennemars won from the last pair, just ahead of Morrison (silver in 2006) and Davis (gold in 2006). European Champion Kramer, who won the bronze medal in 2006, finished fifth, more than a second closer to the lead than in 2006, after setting a new personal best time of 36.41. From the fourth of twelve pairs, 2004 champion Hedrick took the lead with his time of 36.77, but still finished twelfth, nine places down from 2006.

5000 m 
In 2006, Kramer had won this distance by a hundredth of a second over Hedrick, and half a second over fourth-placed Davis. Now, Kramer was dominant, clocking a time which Verheijen in the final pair could only come within four seconds of. Davis finished 14 seconds adrift, falling down to third in the overall standings after the first day, while Fabris in second had also lost to Kramer compared to 2006. Ervik, distance fifth in 2006 only a couple of seconds behind Kramer, opened at 1500-metre pace and slowed down considerably, falling all the way down to ninth.

1500 m 

This became Kramer's weakest distance of the championship, weak enough to allow Fabris to catch up in the overall standings before the final distance. The distance between the two before the final distance was 1.26 seconds, half a second more than in Collalbo. Kramer and Fabris skated in the last pair; before that, Wennemars had set a track record with 1:45.19 in the tenth pair. Davis finished fourth, three places down compared to Calgary, and needed to beat Wennemars on the 10,000 to take bronze - while also keeping Verheijen within 12 seconds, though Verheijen had beaten Davis by ten seconds over the half-distance. Hedrick's thirteenth place meant he was not good enough to qualify for the final distance, but his win over Canadian Justin Warsylewicz in the allround total, however, kept Warsylewicz out of the final distance.

10000 m 
In the final pair, Kramer, who set a world record at the 2006 Championship, now bettered that world record by a second to become the first to skate 10 km below 12:50. Kramer only required to skate 13:12 to become world champion, but in the final pair he and Verheijen were in a class of their own. Verheijen beat Fabris by 15 seconds, but needed to beat him by 19 seconds to take the silver medal, thus the allround podium was identical to that at the European Championships. Ervik finished on the podium on the 10,000 metres for the first time in any race this season, but did not advance significantly in the final standings.

Allround results 

NQ = Not qualified for the 10000 m (only the best 12 are qualified)DQ = disqualified
Notes

Women championships

500 m 
Friesinger, the three-time gold medallist from the World Championships, turned up for the first time since 2005 and did so by winning the first distance, just like in 2005 when she won all four distances. With 38.44, Wüst got her best 500 metre performance at a World Championships, while defending champion Klassen, who had then beaten all opponents by over a second at this distance, finished third.

1500 m 
Wüst finished only a couple of hundredths of a second behind her personal best from Calgary, and beat Friesinger by more than a second, though she was alone in the ninth pair after the scheduled pairmate Groenewold withdrew with illness. Wüst's race was the fastest time ever skated in Europe. In the tenth pair, defending champion Klassen lost eight tenths of a second to Friesinger in the opening 300 metres, which she never regained, even finishing behind compatriot Nesbitt. European Champion Sáblíková finished 11th, trailing by more than four points in the overall standings, which was two points more than she had managed at the European Championships.

3000 m 
In the allround standings, Wüst faced Friesinger in the final pair, with a significant advantage of more than half a point before the distance. Wüst started quicker, and skated away from Friesinger on every lap, eventually finishing 3.8 seconds ahead to have more than a point in the overall classification. Only two of Wüst's laps were above 32 seconds. Klassen came in third on this distance, too, and trailed Friesinger by half a point in the fight for silver, however, the distance to any other medal contender was more than a point. Sáblíková, who won the distance at the European Championships, now skated slightly slower than in Collalbo, and her time from the sixth pair was beaten in the ninth pair by Paulien van Deutekom, who had finished tenth at the European Championships.

5000 m 
Wüst became the youngest world allround women's champion since Karin Busch won in Inzell in 1982, after another win over Friesinger, her third in two days. The second pair saw both the winner and the runner-up on the distance, with Sábliková skating the fastest time ever in Europe, defeating the three-time Olympic gold medallist on the distance, Pechstein, by more than ten seconds. Pechstein still finished second, while Wüst took third place after a much more consistent race than in Collalbo. Friesinger finished poorly, ending in ninth place, but still beating Klassen by 2.4 seconds in the fight for the silver medal.

Allround results 

NQ = Not qualified for the 5000 m (only the best 12 are qualified)DQ = disqualified

Notes

Rules
All 24 participating skaters are allowed to skate the first three distances; 12 skaters may take part on the fourth distance. These 12 skaters are determined by taking the standings on the longest of the first three distances, as well as the samalog standings after three distances, and comparing these lists as follows:

 Skaters among the top 12 on both lists are qualified.
 To make up a total of 12, skaters are then added in order of their best rank on either list. Samalog standings take precedence over longest-distance standings in the event of a tie.

External link and reference
 ISU World Allround Speedskating Championships, official site

World Allround Speed Skating Championships, 2007
2007 World Allround
World Allround, 2007
World Allround Speed Skating Championships, 2007